"Minstrel Krampus" is the eighth episode of the  ninth season and the 160th overall episode of the animated comedy series American Dad!. It aired on Fox in the United States on December 15, 2013, and is written by Murray Miller and Judah Miller and directed by Josue Cervantes. The title of the episode is a play on words, being similar to the syndrome menstrual cramps.

In the hip-hop parody of the 1991 Disney film Beauty and the Beast, a notorious Christmas demon known as Krampus kidnaps a bratty Steve, so Stan and Roger must travel to Bavaria to save him with the help of Stan's estranged father. Meanwhile, Hayley takes a job at the airport to get her family Christmas presents.

Plot

The episode starts in the manner of a storybook, with the narrator stating that children are at their worst at Christmastime, because they have all realized that they'll still get whatever they want regardless of how they behave. The Smith family goes shopping at a toy store. When Francine rejects a toy that Steve wants, he complains–-even slapping Stan in the face—saying, "I'm a bad boy and I get what I want", then breaks into song. Stan and Francine take Steve to visit Stan's imprisoned father Jack and teach him a lesson. Jack tells the legend of Krampus, claiming that as a boy growing up in Bavaria, Jack was visited by Krampus. Before Krampus could punish him, Jack imprisoned him in a large copper pot full of strudel, where he has been trapped ever since.

In a sideplot, Klaus almost tells Hayley what he got from the family, but Hayley cuts him off, singing a song about picking the perfect gift. She visits Roger's bar and asks to work for him, but Roger has already hired a number of water polo players. Stan finds the strudel pot in his basement with Jack's other belongings and, desperate to get Steve under control, opens it. Krampus escapes and kidnaps Steve. Stan gets Jack released from prison to assist him in locating Krampus, but Jack steals Stan's car and flees. Krampus takes Steve to an isolated castle populated by sentient household objects (in the manner of Beauty and the Beast) and sings a song about his legacy and purpose in life, scolding Steve.

Back at the Smith house, Stan tells Roger about the problem and that only Jack knows where Krampus went. Stan also revisits his deadly feud with Santa, going back to a clip from Season 6 Episode 8 where Santa swears revenge on the Smith family. Roger takes Stan to the North Pole to see Santa and ask for his help; Santa accepts, only if they help him kill Krampus. Back at the castle, a group of household objects explains that Krampus is not bad, just serving his role in punishing misbehaving children. Krampus himself explains that his failure to punish Jack resulted in Jack growing up to be a criminal and neglectful father. Steve accepts his apology.

Stan, Roger, and Santa set out on their journey to kill Krampus. Jack is seen complaining about his delayed flight to Jamaica, and he encounters Hayley, now working as an airline ticket clerk, who sings a reggae song about the importance of family, which persuades Jack to change his flight to Bavaria to save his grandson. Steve apologizes to Krampus for his bad behavior and Krampus thanks Steve for reminding him of his purpose. Stan, Santa, and some of Santa's elves reach the castle and battle with the household objects, killing them and confronting Krampus. Santa shoots Krampus to death and reveals that he was the villain all along: Krampus disciplines children because he genuinely loves and cares about them, while Santa just spoils them and makes money off of it, through his investments in toy companies. Santa then tries to take his revenge on Stan, but just as he fires his candy-cane-striped revolver, Jack crashes through a window on skis and takes the bullet in his chest. One of the skis impales Santa's chest, forcing him and the elves to withdraw. Jack then tells Stan that he realizes the importance of family, saying he's proud of Stan and that the world needs Krampus, then dies. His and Krampus' blood mix together and Krampus' soul goes to Jack's body, making him the new Krampus. He leaves with a warning to "better be nice or I'll beat you until blood comes out your ears and eyes. Merry Christmas! And also your ass!"

Production
The episode was originally scheduled to air on December 16, 2012, but was replaced by a repeat of "Wheels & the Legman and the Case of Grandpa's Key" out of sensitivity for the Sandy Hook Elementary School shooting. To compensate for this, they aired the episode "National Treasure 4: Baby Franny: She's Doing Well: The Hole Story" on December 23, 2012.

Reception
Kevin McFarland of The A.V. Club gave the episode an A−, saying "I loved pretty much every part of this. The Hayley plot provides enough simple laughs before basically trailing off into nothing. Francine has very little to do outside of getting verbally abused by Steve. But Stan’s interactions with his father and Santa, and mostly Steve growing into the Belle role and Krampus as a soulful, James Brown-esque Beast (sung by Charles Bradley) was the best part of this Christmas special. It’s not my favorite that the show has ever done, but it’s yet another example that American Dad knows how to do Christmas episodes that stand out during the season more than any other program on television." The episode was watched by a total of 5.00 million people, this made it the fourth most watched show on Animation Domination that night, losing to Bob's Burgers, Family Guy and The Simpsons with 8.48 million.

References

External links 
 

2013 American television episodes
American Dad! (season 10) episodes
American Christmas television episodes
Krampus in popular culture
Television episodes about revenge
Television episodes pulled from general rotation